Kedarsyu (Nepali: केदारस्यु ) is a Gaupalika(Nepali: गाउपालिका ; gaupalika) in Bajhang District in the Sudurpashchim Province of far-western Nepal. 
Kedarsyu has a population of 21307.The land area is 113.91 km2.

References

Rural municipalities of Nepal